Each of the eight teams of Minor League Baseball's California League carry a 30-man active roster. Only these players are eligible to play.

Teams may have any number of inactive players on their rosters at a given time who do not count toward active roster limits. Injured players may be placed on the injured list (7-day or 60-day). The temporary inactive list and bereavement list are for players attending to personal matters. Major league players may be placed on rosters for injury rehabilitation for a maximum of 20 days for non-pitchers and 30 days for pitchers.

Players who are ineligible to play due to failure to adhere to the Minor League Drug Prevention and Treatment Program, violations of their contract, who are receiving team disciplinary action, or who are unable to join the team due to visa problems may be placed on the restricted or suspended lists. These players count against a team's active roster limit.

Each team usually has a three-man coaching staff including a manager, hitting coach, and pitching coach. Depending on each Major League Baseball organization's development approach, some teams may have additional coaches.

North Division

Fresno Grizzlies

Modesto Nuts

San Jose Giants

Stockton Ports

South Division

Inland Empire 66ers of San Bernardino

Lake Elsinore Storm

Rancho Cucamonga Quakes

Visalia Rawhide

See also
List of Carolina League team rosters
List of Florida State League team rosters

References

California League
Rosters
California League team rosters